Iyen Island is in the Louisiade Archipelago, within Milne Bay Province of southeastern Papua New Guinea.

It is jurisdictionally in the Yaleyamba Rural Local Level Government Area.

References

Islands of Milne Bay Province
Louisiade Archipelago